The 1949 World Table Tennis Championships men's doubles was the 16th edition of the men's doubles championship.
Ivan Andreadis and František Tokár won the title after defeating Bohumil Váňa and Ladislav Štípek in the final by three sets to nil.

Results

See also
 List of World Table Tennis Championships medalists

References

-